The Houston Cougars are the athletic teams representing the University of Houston. Informally, the Houston Cougars have also been referred to as the Coogs, UH, or simply Houston. Houston's nickname was suggested by early physical education instructor of the university and former head football coach, John R. Bender after one of his former teams, Washington State  later adopted the mascot and nickname. The teams compete in the NCAA's Division I and the Football Bowl Subdivision as members of the American Athletic Conference.

The official school colors of the University of Houston are scarlet red and albino white, and the mascot is a cougar named Shasta.  Houston's traditional rival has been Rice with whom the Cougars shared a conference for thirty-three non-consecutive years (see also Houston–Rice rivalry).

Houston has had notable sports teams in its history, including Phi Slama Jama and the sixteen-time national champion men's golf team. The university's campus is home to many on-campus athletic facilities including TDECU Stadium (on the site of the former Robertson Stadium), Fertitta Center, and Darryl & Lori Schroeder Park.

Prior to 1960, Houston was a member of several athletic conferences including the Lone Star Conference, Gulf Coast Conference, and Missouri Valley Conference. From 1960 until 1971, Houston competed as an independent. From 1971 until 1996, Houston's sports teams were a part of the Southwest Conference. After the dissolution of that conference in 1996, the Cougars became charter members of Conference USA.  Houston remained a member of Conference USA until 2013 when they joined the American Athletic Conference. In September 2021, Houston received and accepted a membership offer to the Big 12 Conference. They will become members of the Big 12 on July 1, 2023.

Sports sponsored 

The most recently added sport was women's golf. Two players represented UH as individuals in the 2014 season (played during the 2013–14 school year), and a complete team was formed starting in the 2014–15 season.

Football

UH fielded its first varsity intercollegiate football team in 1946. The Houston Cougars football team currently competes in the NCAA Division I Football Bowl Subdivision. After completing 18 seasons in C-USA in 2012, the Cougars joined the American Athletic Conference in 2013. The team played its home games at Robertson Stadium before it was closed and demolished after the 2012 season. The Cougars divided their home schedule in their first AAC season between Reliant Stadium and BBVA Compass Stadium; the new TDECU Stadium opened on the Robertson Stadium site in 2014.

The Cougars are coached by Dana Holgorsen, who was named head coach in January 2019 following the firing on December 30, 2018, of Major Applewhite, under whom the team had gone 0–3 in bowl games, including a 70–14 loss to Army.

Basketball

The Houston Cougars men's basketball team represents the University of Houston in NCAA Division I men's basketball competition. The Cougars Men's basketball team plays in the American Athletic Conference. The team last played in the NCAA Division I men's basketball tournament in 2022. The Cougars are currently coached by Kelvin Sampson. The Cougars play their home games in the Fertitta Center, which opened during the 2018–19 season after renovation of the former Hofheinz Pavilion.  During the renovation, home games were played at H&PE Arena at Texas Southern University.

Notable players for the UH Men's basketball team include Basketball Hall of Famers Hakeem Olajuwon and Clyde Drexler (who would win two and one NBA Championships respectively, both for the hometown Houston Rockets in 1994–95, with Olajuwon being the Finals MVP for both titles) and also were part of the legendary Cougars fraternity Phi Slama Jama, as well as Otis Birdsong and Hall of Famer Elvin Hayes (who would win one NBA Championship with the Washington Bullets in 1978). Each of these players has had his number retired. Notable coaches for the Cougars are Guy Lewis and Clyde Drexler. Notable games for the Cougars include the first nationally syndicated NCAA basketball game, known as the "Game of the Century," and the NCAA National Championship Games in 1983 and 1984.

The women's team has made the NCAA Tournament in 1988, 1992, 2004, 2005, and 2011. The women played their entire 2017–18 home schedule at H&PE Arena.

Baseball

Along with the university's other athletic teams, the baseball team is a member of the American Athletic Conference as a Division I team. They play their home games at Darryl & Lori Schroeder Park and are currently coached by Todd Whitting.  The Houston Cougars baseball program has appeared in numerous NCAA Regionals, Super Regionals, and College World Series.

Softball

The Houston Cougars softball team is the college softball team of the University of Houston. The team is a member of the American Athletic Conference as a Division I team. Their home games are played at Cougar Softball Stadium on-campus. The team was established in 2001, and was the regular season champion of Conference USA three times. The Cougars are coached by Kristin Vesely.

Championships

NCAA team championships

Houston has won 17 NCAA team national championships.

Men's (17)
Cross Country (1): 1960
Golf (16): 1956, 1957, 1958, 1959, 1960, 1962, 1964, 1965, 1966, 1967, 1969, 1970, 1977, 1982, 1984, 1985
see also:
American Athletic Conference NCAA team championships
List of NCAA schools with the most NCAA Division I championships
List of NCAA schools with the most Division I national championships

Notable non varsity sports

Rugby
The University of Houston Rugby Club plays college rugby in the Red River Conference of Division 1-A Rugby against traditional rivals such as Texas, Texas Tech, Texas A&M, and TCU.  The UH Rugby Club previously played Division III college rugby.
The UH Rugby Club is a registered organization sponsored by the UH campus recreation department.

Cricket
The University of Houston Cricket Club won the 2019 National College Cricket Association championship.

Rivalries

Houston's most meaningful current rivalry is with cross-town Rice University, which is a member of Conference USA. The Cougars and Rice Owls have competed in football, annually with a few exceptions, for a trophy known as the "Bayou Bucket", referencing one of the city of Houston's nicknames as the "Bayou City."

Historically, the University of Texas was one of Houston's principal rivals, when Houston was part of the now-defunct Southwest Conference. This rivalry gave rise to the Houston Cougar Paw tradition.

Athletic facilities
Most of the university's major sports facilities are located along Cullen Boulevard, the central traffic artery through the campus.  At times in the past, some of the university's teams have played their home games at off-campus venues such as the Astrodome and Rice Stadium. The men's golf program competes off campus because it does not have a dedicated golf course on campus. University of Houston's current sports facilities include the following:

TDECU Stadium – Football
Fertitta Center – Men's and Women's Basketball
Darryl and Lori Schroeder Park – Baseball
Cougar Softball Stadium – Softball
Tom Tellez Track at Carl Lewis International Complex – Outdoor Track and Field and Soccer
John E. Hoff Courts – Tennis
CRWC Natatorium – Swimming & Diving
Athletics/Alumni Center – (Home venues: indoor tennis, Indoor track and field, Volleyball), (Practice: Football and Basketball), (Training: All Sports)
Yeoman Fieldhouse – Indoor Track & Field
Redstone Golf Club – Men's and Women's Golf
Dave Williams Golf Academy – Men's and Women's Golf

The Houston Dynamo of Major League Soccer was a tenant at Robertson Stadium until 2011. The stadium hosted the MLS Western Conference Final in 2006 and 2007.

References

External links